Tahnee Ahtoneharjo-Growingthunder (also known as Tahnee Ahtone), is a Kiowa beadwork artist, regalia maker, curator, and museum professional of Muscogee and Seminole descent, from Mountain View, Oklahoma.

Background 
Ahtoneharjo-Growingthunder is the daughter of Amos Harjo (Seminole, Muscogee) and Sharron Ahtone Harjo (Kiowa), a respected painter, ledger artist, and educator. Her maternal grandparents were Evelyn Tahome and Jacob Ahtone, who served as Kiowa tribal chairman from 1978 to 1980, and as a United States Department of Interior administrator who contributed to the American Indian Religious Freedom Act and the Indian Arts and Craft Act of 1990. Tahnee is named after her great-aunt who died as a child, Ah-stom-pah Ote, which translates to "The One Chosen to Lead In." She is the great-granddaughter of famed lattice cradleboard artists Kiowa captive Millie Durgan, and Tahdo Ahtone. The Ahtone family descend from Fort Marion prisoners and Red River War veterans held at St. Augustine, Florida, noted as Kiowa Ledger Art artists. After his incarceration from Fort Marion, the family's ancestor, Beahko, was sent to Hampton Institute by Richard Henry Pratt. Today, the Ahtone family along with many other Kiowa families hold distinctions as fifth and six generations to obtain advanced and higher education degrees.

Education 
Ahtoneharjo-Growingthunder earned her museum studies BFA degree in 2015 from the Institute of American Indian Arts in Santa Fe. She earned her Master of Liberal Arts degree in museology from Harvard Extension School in Cambridge, Massachusetts.

Artwork 
A dancer on the powwow circuit, Ahtoneharjo-Growingthunder mastered beadwork and sewing dance regalia. Besides creating regalia for the Native community, she also exhibits at major Native American art events, including Santa Fe Indian Market, the National Museum of the American Indian, the Chickasaw Nation's Artesian Arts Festival, and the Red Earth Festival, where her beadwork has won prizes. She is known for figurative work in beadwork. Her work has been part of curated art shows, such as Generations (2013) at the Red Earth Center and Current Realities: A Dialogue with the People (2007) at Individual Artists of Oklahoma (IAO) gallery.

Curatorial practice 
Ahtoneharjo-Growingthunder is director of the Kiowa Tribal Museum in Carnegie, Oklahoma. Previously she worked at the Oklahoma History Center in Oklahoma City, Oklahoma, as a liaison to Oklahoma's 38 federally recognized tribes. She served as curator of the textile and American Indian Collections at the Oklahoma History Center.

Before returning to Oklahoma, she was the curator and collections manager for the Mashantucket Pequot Museum and Research Center in Ledyard, Connecticut. While at the Pequot Museum, she curated Without a Theme, a group exhibition of First Nations and Native American visual artists who did not necessarily use Native imagery or subject matter in their artwork. Ahtoneharjo-Growingthunder's other museum contributions include serving the Wallraf-Richartz Museum in Cologne, Germany Once Upon A Time in America, Three Centuries of US- American Art as the cultural adviser, and her participation in the Brown University, Haffenreffer Museum of Anthropology Gifts of Pride and Love: Kiowa and Comanche Cradles exhibition, a research project the Ahtone family contributed to with curator Barbara Hail.

Her research focus is textiles; however, she has extensive knowledge on Native American textile art and beadwork, including beaded medallions.

Ahtoneharjo-Growingthunder and her husband, George Growing Thunder, own GT Museum Services, a New York City based firm offering consulting and other services to museums.

Awards 
Ahtoneharjo-Growingthunder has been awarded curatorial fellowships with the Center for Curatorial Leadership (2021), the Emily Hall Tremaine Foundation, Journalism Fellowship for Curators (2021), and the Oklahoma Museums Association, Service to the Profession Award for 2019.

Personal 
Ahtoneharjo-Growingthunder is married to George Growing Thunder (Assiniboine). Her mother-in-law is beadwork artist Joyce Growing Thunder Fogarty. Ahtoneharjo-Growingthunder has three step-children, and the couple have two daughters.

Notes

References
 Pearce, Richard (2013). Women and Ledger Art: Four Contemporary Native American Artists. Tucson: University of Arizona Press. .

External links 
Podcast: Curating Indigeneity, hosted by Tahnee M. Ahtone (Tahnee Ahtoneharjo-Growingthunder)
 "What It Means to Curate for My Native American Community", Hyperallergic
 "Kiowa Murals Embody Kiowa Language, Culture, and Community", Hyperallergic

Living people
American women curators
American curators
Artists from Oklahoma City
Harvard Extension School alumni
Institute of American Indian Arts alumni
Kiowa people
Native American curators
Native American bead artists
Native American women artists
People from Carnegie, Oklahoma
Year of birth missing (living people)
21st-century American women artists
21st-century Native American women
21st-century Native Americans